Sloan Wilson (May 8, 1920 – May 25, 2003) was an American writer.

Reporter
Sloan was born in Norwalk, Connecticut, the grandson of US Navy officer and Arctic explorer John Wilson Danenhower. Wilson graduated from Harvard University in 1942. He then served in World War II as an officer of the United States Coast Guard, commanding a naval trawler for the Greenland Patrol and an army supply ship in the Pacific Ocean.

After the war, Wilson worked as a reporter for Time-Life. His first book, Voyage to Somewhere, was published in 1947 and was based on his wartime experiences. He also published stories in The New Yorker and worked as a professor at the University of Buffalo, now called the State University of New York at Buffalo.

Novelist
Wilson published 15 books, including the bestsellers The Man in the Gray Flannel Suit (1955) and A Summer Place (1958), both of which were adapted into feature movies. A later novel, A Sense of Values, in which protagonist Nathan Bond is a disenchanted cartoonist involved with adultery and alcoholism, was not well received. In Georgie Winthrop, a 45-year-old college vice president begins a relationship with the 17-year-old daughter of his childhood love. The novel The Ice Brothers is loosely based on Wilson's experiences in Greenland while serving with the US Coast Guard. The memoir What Shall We Wear to This Party? recalls his experiences in the Coast Guard during World War II and the changes to his life after the bestseller Gray Flannel was published.

Wilson was an advocate for integrating, funding and improving public schools. He became Assistant Director of the National Citizens Commission for Public Schools as well as Assistant Director of the 1955-56 White House Conference on Education.

Personal life
Wilson suffered from alcoholism throughout his life, and Alzheimer's disease toward the end. In addition to novels and magazine articles, he funded himself during his later years by writing commissioned works such as biographies and yacht histories. He was living in Colonial Beach, Virginia at the time of his death.

Wilson was married twice, first to Elise Pickhardt in 1941.  They had three children: Rebecca Wilson, David Sloan Wilson, and Lisa.  Rebecca is a nurse, David is an evolutionary biologist, and Lisa is an author.  His second wife was Betty Stephens, whom he married in 1962. They had one daughter, Jessie.

Wilson's service as an officer in World War II is noted at the United States Coast Guard Academy in New London, Connecticut.

In the 1970s Wilson and his wife and daughter lived at Dinner Key Marina in Coconut Grove, Florida on a 54' cruiser, the Pretty Betty.

Connection to Unabomber
A copy of one of Wilson's books, Ice Brothers, was used to conceal a bomb by terrorist Ted Kaczynski (the Unabomber). Kaczynski sent a parcel to the Lake Forest, Illinois home of the President of United Airlines, Percy Wood. On June 10, 1980, Wood received the parcel in the mail; it contained a copy of Ice Brothers. When Wood opened the book, a bomb concealed inside exploded, injuring him severely.

Bibliography

Novels
Voyage to Somewhere (1947)
The Man in the Gray Flannel Suit (1955)
A Summer Place (1958)
A Sense of Values (1961)
Georgie Winthrop (1963)
Janus Island (1967)
All the Best People (1971)
Small Town (1978)
Ice Brothers (1979)
Greatest Crime (1980)
Pacific Interlude (1982)
The Man in the Gray Flannel Suit II (1984)

Autobiographies
Away from It All (1969)
What Shall We Wear to This Party?: The Man in the Gray Flannel Suit, Twenty Years Before & After (1976)

Short fiction
"The Best and Most Powerful Machines" (Harper's Magazine, June 1946)
"The Octopus" (The New Yorker, June 1946)
"The Wonderful Plans" (The New Yorker, December 1946)
"Check for $90,000" (The New Yorker, February 1947)
"Bearer of Bad Tidings" (The New Yorker, March 1947)
"Housewarming" (The New Yorker, May 1947)
"A Very Old Man" (The New Yorker, September 1947)
"Drunk on the Train" (The New Yorker, January 1948)
"The Reunion" (The New Yorker, March 1948)
"Bygones" (The New Yorker, June 1949)
"The Alarm Clock" (The New Yorker, February 1951)
"The Powder Keg" (The New Yorker, October 1951)
"The Black Mollies" (Harper's Magazine, December 1951)
"A Sword for my Children" (The New Yorker, December 1951)
"A Letter of Admonition" (The New Yorker, December 1951)
"Citation" (The New Yorker, February 1952)
"The Cook and the Book" (The New Yorker, April 1952)
"The Disappearance" (The New Yorker, May 1952)
"The News" (The New Yorker, June 1952)
"The Regatta" (The New Yorker, June 1952)
"A Friendship Sloop" (The New Yorker, April 1953)
"Lollapalooza and the Rogers Rock Hotel" (The New Yorker, October 1953)

Poetry
The Soldiers who Sit (The New Yorker, January 1945)
Cup and Lip (The New Yorker, March 1946)

Nonfiction
"Public Schools Are Better Than You Think" (Harper's Magazine, September 1955)
"It's Time to Close Our Carnival" (Life, March 24, 1958)
"The American Way of Birth" (Harper's Magazine, July 1964)
A Love Letter to the Big Ditch (Motor Boating & Sailing, November 1970)
"The Heirs of Captain Slocum: Alone At Sea" (Harper's Magazine, August 1980)

References

1920 births
2003 deaths
20th-century American novelists
American male novelists
United States Coast Guard personnel of World War II
Harvard University alumni
Deaths from Alzheimer's disease
Writers from Norwalk, Connecticut
People from Colonial Beach, Virginia
University at Buffalo alumni
20th-century American male writers
Novelists from Connecticut
Military personnel from Connecticut
United States Coast Guard officers
Neurological disease deaths in Virginia